Tomas Erixon (born 16 April 1955) is a Swedish professional football manager who currently manages GAIS.

References

Living people
1955 births
Swedish football managers
GAIS managers
Place of birth missing (living people)